Lubukraya is an andesitic stratovolcano on Sumatra island, Indonesia. It has a broad crater breached to the south and a lava dome at the southern foot of the volcano.

See also 

 List of volcanoes in Indonesia

References 

Volcanoes of Sumatra
Stratovolcanoes of Indonesia
Mountains of Sumatra
Pleistocene stratovolcanoes